The Natural Resources Acts were a series of Acts passed by the Parliament of Canada and the provinces of Alberta, British Columbia, Manitoba and Saskatchewan in 1930 to transfer control over crown lands and natural resources within these provinces from the Government of Canada to the provincial governments.  Alberta, Manitoba and Saskatchewan had not been given control over their natural resources  when they entered Confederation, unlike the other Canadian provinces.  British Columbia had surrendered certain portions of its natural resources and Crown lands to the federal government, the Railway Belt and the Peace River Block, when it entered Confederation in 1871, as part of the agreement for the building of the transcontinental railway.

Following protracted negotiations, in 1930 the Government of Canada and the four provinces reached a series of agreements for the transfer of the administration of the natural resources to the provincial governments, called the Natural Resources Transfer Agreements.  Parliament and the four provincial legislatures then passed acts to implement the agreements.  Finally, the British Parliament passed the Constitution Act, 1930, to ratify the agreements, entrenching them in the Constitution of Canada.  The passage of these Acts rendered the Dominion Lands Act obsolete, since these same lands were no longer under federal jurisdiction.

A few small sections of resource-rich territory were excluded from the act, although they would be transferred later. First Nations reserves and lands reserved for indigenous persons were excluded under the Indian Act. National parks were also excluded - they remain under the jurisdiction of the federal government, and are generally off-limits to resource development.

Alberta Natural Resource Transfer Agreement of 1930 
The Alberta Natural Resource Transfer Agreement restricts the inherent hunting and fishing rights for Indigenous Peoples. “The Natural Resource Transfer Agreements with the three Western Provinces provide that laws respecting game in the province shall apply to Indians within the boundaries of the province”.

References

External links
Moving Here, Staying Here: The Canadian Immigrant Experience at Library and Archives Canada

Constitution of Canada
Canadian federal legislation
Canadian provincial legislation
Economic history of Canada
Political history of Alberta
Political history of British Columbia
Political history of Manitoba
Political history of Saskatchewan
History of the Northwest Territories
Legal history of Canada
1930 in Canadian law
1930 in Alberta
Canadian Prairies
Natural resources law
1930 in British Columbia
1930 in Manitoba
1930 in Saskatchewan